Thomas Sherlock (167818 July 1761)  was a British divine who served as a Church of England bishop for 33 years. He is also noted in church history as an important contributor to Christian apologetics.

Life
Born in London, he was the son of the Very Reverend William Sherlock, Dean of St Paul's. He was educated at Eton College and St Catharine's College, Cambridge. In 1704 he succeeded his father as Master of the Temple, where he was very popular.

Sherlock died in July 1761, and is buried in the churchyard of All Saints Church, Fulham, Middlesex. Much of his ancestral and earned wealth passed to the Gooch baronets who took Sherlock for many generations thereafter in tribute; his picture hanging in Benacre Hall, their purchased home in the period of his passing.

Career
In 1714 he became master of his old college at Cambridge and later the university's vice-chancellor, whose privileges he defended against Richard Bentley. In 1715, he was appointed Dean of Chichester.

He took a prominent part in the Bangorian controversy against Benjamin Hoadly. Sherlock became Bishop of Bangor in 1728. He was translated to Salisbury in 1734, where he was ex officio Chancellor of the Order of the Garter; and in 1748 to London, where he was sworn of the Privy Council.  Sherlock was a capable administrator and cultivated friendly relations with Dissenters. In Parliament he gave good service to his old schoolfellow, Robert Walpole, Prime Minister of Great Britain.

Writings

He published against Anthony Collins's deistic Grounds of the Christian Religion a volume of sermons entitled The Use and Intent of Prophecy in the Several Ages of the World (1725); and in reply to Thomas Woolston's Discourses on the Miracles he wrote a volume entitled The Tryal of the Witnesses of the Resurrection of Jesus (1729), which soon ran through fourteen editions. His Pastoral Letter (1750) on the late earthquakes had a circulation of many thousands, and four or five volumes of Sermons which he published in his later years (1754–1758) were also at one time highly esteemed. Jane Austen, wrote to her niece Anna in 1814, "I am very fond of Sherlock's Sermons, prefer them to almost any."

A collected edition of his works, with a memoir, in five volumes, by Thomas Smart Hughes, appeared in 1830.

Sherlock's Tryal of the Witnesses is generally understood by scholars such as Edward Carpenter, Colin Brown and William Lane Craig, to be a work that the Scottish philosopher David Hume had probably read, and to which Hume offered a counter viewpoint in his empiricist arguments against the possibility of miracles.

Sherlock also wrote a respected work entitled A Discourse Concerning the Divine Providence, in which he argues that the Sovereignty and Providence of God are unimpeachable.

Apologetics
Since the Deist controversy Sherlock's argument for the evidences of the resurrection of Jesus Christ has continued to interest later Christian apologists such as William Lane Craig and John Warwick Montgomery. His place in the history of apologetics has been classified by Ross Clifford as belonging to the legal or juridical school of Christian apologetics.

Notes

References

Further reading
Colin Brown, Miracles and the Critical Mind (Exeter: Paternoster/Grand Rapids: William B. Eerdmans Publishing Co., 1984). 
Edward Carpenter, Thomas Sherlock 1678–1761 (London: SPCK, 1936).
Ross Clifford, John Warwick Montgomery's Legal Apologetic: An Apologetic for All Seasons (Bonn: Verlag fur kultur und Wissenschaft, 2004). 
William Lane Craig, The Historical Argument for the Resurrection of Jesus During the Deist Controversy (Lewiston & Queenston: Edwin Mellen Press, 1985).

External links
 
 
 

1678 births
1761 deaths
People educated at Eton College
Alumni of St Catharine's College, Cambridge
Bishops of Bangor
Bishops of London
Deans of the Chapel Royal
Bishops of Salisbury
Chancellors of the College of William & Mary
Members of the Privy Council of Great Britain
Writers from London
Masters of the Temple
Masters of St Catharine's College, Cambridge
English sermon writers
Deans of Chichester
18th-century Church of England bishops
Vice-Chancellors of the University of Cambridge
Chancellors of the Order of the Garter
Burials at All Saints Church, Fulham
18th-century Welsh Anglican bishops
17th-century Anglican theologians
18th-century Anglican theologians